Zwickel may refer to:

 Zwickelbier, a German lager
 Zwickel (card game), a north German card game its feature of sweeping all the cards off the table